Megaverse may refer to:

Megaversal system, role-playing game mechanics designed for Palladium Books
Multiverse, or megaverse, any hypothetical set of multiple universes in cosmology and other disciplines

See also 
 Metaverse (disambiguation)
 Multiverse (disambiguation)
 Omniverse (disambiguation)
 Universe (disambiguation)